Pagar Gunung is a village in Kotanopan district, Mandailing Natal Regency in North Sumatra province, Indonesia. Its population is 178.

Climate
Pagar Gunung has a tropical rainforest climate (Af) with heavy to very heavy rainfall year-round.

References

 Populated places in North Sumatra